Baltoniodus is an extinct genus of conodonts.

Use in stratigraphy 
The base of the Dapingian, the third stage of the Middle Ordovician, is defined as the first appearance of Baltoniodus triangularis.

The Whiterock Stage refers mainly to the early Middle Ordovician in North America, it is often used in the older literature in a global sense. The Whiterock Stage is given a range from 471.8 (ca. 472) to 462 m.y.a., spanning close to 10 million years. Officially its start is defined by the potentially lowest occurrence of the conodont Protoprioniodus aranda or Baltoniodus triangularis.

B. gerdae has been found in the early Sandbian Bromide Formation, in Oklahoma, USA.

References

External links 
 

Prioniodontida genera
Ordovician conodonts
Middle Ordovician first appearances
Late Ordovician extinctions
Bromide Formation